Carl Christian Mez (26 March 1866 – 8 January 1944) was a German botanist and university professor. He is denoted by the author abbreviation Mez when citing a botanical name.

Life and work

Mez came from a family of industrialists in Freiburg im Breisgau, Baden. He was a grandchild of the entrepreneur and politician Karl Christian Mez (1808–1877). As a high-school student he was interested in botany, and wrote a technical paper regarding a hybrid Inula. In 1890, Mez married Therese (Thea) Jensen (1867–1937), the daughter of poet Wilhelm Jensen. They had 5 children together. Through their oldest daughter's marriage, they became parents-in-law to psychologist Narziß Ach.

He first studied at the university in his hometown from 1883 to 1884, and then moved to Berlin for one semester before returning in 1886 to Freiburg. He wrote his thesis at Berlin, on the Lauraceae (the Laurel family), and received his Ph.D. from there.

After completing his degree, Mez worked briefly at the Berlin Botanical Museum, then moved to Breslau where he worked as a private lecturer. In 1900, Mez became Professor of Systematic Botany and Pharmaceutical Studies in Halle, and in 1910 he became Professor of Plant-physiology and Director of the Botanical Gardens near Königsberg. He was made Professor Emeritus in 1935.

Mez was founder of the Botanical Archives, and, until 1938, publisher as well.

His main areas of research were systematics and physiology. He continued to study the taxonomy and morphology of the Lauraceae, and introduced the use of serology as a method of studying plant relationships. Also, he studied mycology, and wrote about dry rot.

The plant genera Mezia (Schwacke ex Nied.), Meziella (Schindl.) and Neomezia (family Primulaceae) were all named in his honor.

Writings (selected)

 Lauraceae Americanae, monographice descripsit / - Berlin, 1889. Jahrbuch des königlichen botanischen Gartens und des botanischen Museums; Bd. 5
 Das Mikroskop und seine Anwendung : ein Leitfaden bei mikroskopischen Untersuchungen für Apotheker, Aerzte, Medicinalbeamte, Techniker, Gewerbtreibende etc.- 8., stark verm. Aufl. - Berlin : 1899
 Myrsinaceae. Leipzig [u.a.] 1902.
 Mikroskopische Untersuchungen, vorgeschrieben vom Deutschen Arzneibuch : Leitfaden für das mikroskopisch-pharmakognostische Praktikum an Hochschulen und für den Selbstunterricht - Berlin : 1902
 Theophrastaceae - Leipzig [u.a.] : 1903
 Der Hausschwamm und die übrigen holzzerstörenden Pilze der menschlichen Wohnungen : ihre Erkennung, Bedeutung und Bekämpfung. Dresden 1908.
 Die Haftung für Hausschwamm und Trockenfäule: eine Denkschrift für Baumeister, Hausbesitzer und Juristen .... Berlin 1910.
 Zur Theorie der Sero-Diagnostik - Berlin: Dt. Verl.-Ges. für Politik und Geschichte, 1925
 Drei Vorträge über die Stammesgeschichte der Pflanzenwelt mit 1 Stammbaum des Pflanzenreichs / 1925
 Theorien der Stammesgeschichte - Berlin : Deutsche Verl.-Ges für Politik und Geschichte, 1926
 Versuch einer Stammesgeschichte des Pilzreiches. Halle (Saale) 1928.
 Bromeliaceae. Leipzig 1935.

References

 F. Butzin (1968): Carl Mez, ein Leben für die Botanik. Willdenowia 4: 401-415.
 Ilse Jahn (2000): Geschichte der Biologie. Spektrum

External links
Literature about and by Carl Christian Mez in the catalog of the Deutschen Nationalbibliothek
List of plants described by Carl Christian Mez (IPNI)
Malpighiaceae/Mezia

German taxonomists
1866 births
1944 deaths
Botanists with author abbreviations
Humboldt University of Berlin alumni
University of Freiburg alumni
Academic staff of the Martin Luther University of Halle-Wittenberg
Academic staff of the University of Breslau
Academic staff of the University of Königsberg
Scientists from Freiburg im Breisgau
People from the Grand Duchy of Baden
19th-century German botanists
20th-century German botanists